The Panasonic Lumix DMC-GX8 is a digital rangefinder-styled mirrorless interchangeable-lens camera announced by Panasonic on July 16, 2015.  The camera features a newly developed 20 megapixel sensor - previously the highest resolution in Micro Four Thirds cameras was 16 megapixels. The camera's ISO range touches 25600 and it can capture continuous frames at up to 8 frames per second. One major new feature introduced in the camera is "Dual IS", the camera 5 axis image stabilisation gets synchronised, when available, with lens based image stabilisation. The camera also records 4K video, but with addition crop around 1.6x.

The manufacturer has indicated the time to acquire auto focus as 0.07 seconds. The electronic OLED viewfinder has a resolution of 2.36 million dots and, as in the predecessor, is tiltable. The  OLED touchscreen rear display is fully articulated and can display 1.04 million dots. The camera is splash proof.

A smaller version of the GX8, the Panasonic GX80 (retailed as the GX85 in the United States and as the GX7 Mark II in Japan) was announced on April 4, 2016. The camera features many of the same features of the Panasonic GX8 camera but utilises a 16 megapixel sensor instead of the 20 megapixel sensor of the GX8. The Panasonic GX80/GX85 became the first Panasonic Micro Four Thirds camera to do without a low-pass filter. According to the claim made by Panasonic, the Panasonic GX80/GX85 will have 10% more fine detail resolving power than cameras with a similar sensor which do include a low pass filter.

Gallery

References

http://www.dpreview.com/products/panasonic/slrs/panasonic_dmcgx8/specifications
http://thenewcamera.com/tag/panasonic-gx8/
http://www.cameracomparisonreview.com/tag/panasonic-gx80/

GX8